Zdeněk Fikar (born 18 May 1926) is a former figure skater. He represented Czechoslovakia at the 1948 Winter Olympics in St. Moritz, Switzerland and finished 13th. Fikar also competed at one World and six European Championships. His best result, fourth, came at the 1950 European Championships in Oslo, Norway.

Competitive highlights

References

External links
  

1926 births
Possibly living people
Czechoslovak male single skaters
Olympic figure skaters of Czechoslovakia
Figure skaters at the 1948 Winter Olympics